The blackish antbird (Cercomacroides nigrescens) is a species of passerine bird in the family Thamnophilidae. It is found in Bolivia, Brazil, Colombia, Ecuador, French Guiana, Peru, and Suriname. Its natural habitats are subtropical or tropical moist lowland forests, subtropical or tropical moist montane forests, and heavily degraded former forest.

The blackish antbird was described by the German ornithologists Jean Cabanis and Ferdinand Heine in 1860 and given the binomial name Percnostola nigrescens. The specific epithet is from the Latin nigrescens "blackish" (from nigrescere  "to become black"). The antbird was subsequently included in the genus Cercomacra but a molecular phylogenetic study published in 2014 found that Cercomacra was polyphyletic. The genus was split to create two monophyletic genera and six species including the blackish antbird were moved to the newly erected genus Cercomacroides.

There are five subspecies:
 Cercomacroides nigrescens nigrescens (Cabanis & Heine, 1860) – Suriname, French Guiana and ne Brazil
 Cercomacroides nigrescens aequatorialis (Zimmer, JT, 1931) – south central Colombia, east Ecuador and northeast Peru
 Cercomacroides nigrescens notata (Zimmer, JT, 1931) – central Peru
 Cercomacroides nigrescens approximans (Pelzeln, 1868) – central Brazil
 Cercomacroides nigrescens ochrogyna Snethlage, E, 1928) – east central Brazil

References

blackish antbird
Birds of the Amazon Basin
Birds of the Guianas
blackish antbird
Taxonomy articles created by Polbot